α-Naphtholphthalein (C28H18O4) is a phthalein dye used as a pH indicator with a visual transition from colorless/reddish to greenish blue at pH 7.3–8.7.

References

PH indicators
1-Naphthols
Phthalides
Triarylmethane dyes